Sinar Harian (Daily Light) is a Malay-language daily newspaper published in Shah Alam, Selangor, Malaysia in a compact format. It first hit the newsstands on 31 March 2006 in the East Coast states of Kelantan and Terengganu before expanding its distribution to the state of Selangor and the federal territory of Kuala Lumpur in the West Coast in September 2007.

The newspaper occasionally organises public forums and debates at which politicians and public figures are invited to speak, regardless of viewpoint.

Sinar Daily is published by Sinar Karangkraf Sdn Bhd (formerly Akhbar Cabaran Sdn Bhd), a company related to Kumpulan Karangkraf, a major media and publishing interest in Malaysia and currently has a cover price of RM 1.80.

Features 
While providing the standard fare of national and international news, Sinar Harian also has a unique niche in providing regional and local news based on the regional editions published in the form of a pull-out section that takes up more than half of the printed pages in every issue. Current regional editions available are Northern editions (Perak, Penang, Kedah, Perlis), Central editions (Selangor and federal territories of Kuala Lumpur and Putrajaya), East Coast editions (Pahang, Terengganu, Kelantan) and Southern editions (Malacca, Negeri Sembilan, Johor).

Regional correspondents known as Skuad Cakna (literally meaning Concerned Squads, possibly colloquial for Snoop Squads) are stationed in each district and major population centres in the states where the respective editions are published.

Notably, Sinar Harian was the only conventional Malay newspaper which reported favourably on the opposition-backed People's Uprising Rally (KL 112) on 13 January 2013, while other dailies such as Utusan Malaysia and Berita Harian either grossly distorted the events or ignored the rally altogether.

Trivia 
 The newspaper's slogan; Cakna & Dinamik; uses a term from the Terengganuan Malay dialect, cakna, which literally means to be concerned
 On 13 February 2018, Sinar Harian has published an article with a gay checklist, with information how to spot homosexuals, and also with an interview with the homophobic Muslim scholar Hanafiah Abdul Malek.

References

External links 
 
 

2006 establishments in Malaysia
Newspapers published in Malaysia
Malay-language newspapers
Mass media in Shah Alam
Publications established in 2006